Cryptocteniza is a monotypic genus of North American mygalomorph spiders in the family Euctenizidae containing the single species, Cryptocteniza kawtak. It was first described by Jason Bond, C. A. Hamilton and R. L. Godwin in 2020, and it has only been found in the United States.

See also
 List of Euctenizidae species

References

Euctenizidae
Monotypic Mygalomorphae genera
Spiders of the United States